Toua is a Papua New Guinean name. Notable people with this name include:

Surname
 Aidan Toua (born 1990), Papua New Guinean rugby player
 Dika Toua (born 1984), Papua New Guinean weightlifter
 Isabel Toua, Papua New Guinean cricketer

Given name
 Toua Tueni (born 1997), Tuvaluan football player
 Toua Udia (born 1992), Papsa New Guinean weightlifter

See also
 Tua (disambiguation)